John Rhodes Horam, Baron Horam (born 7 March 1939) is a Conservative politician in the United Kingdom. He is the only MP since the Second World War to have sat in the House of Commons for three different political parties, latterly as the Conservative Member of Parliament (MP) for Orpington (1992-2010). He has been a Minister in both Labour and Conservative Governments.  On 4 September 2013, he was created a working life peer as Baron Horam of Grimsargh in the County of Lancashire. He is a founder and vice chair of the Common Sense Group of Conservative Parliamentarians.

Early life
Horam was born in Grimsargh in the city of Preston, Lancashire.  He went to the independent Silcoates School in Wakefield, West Yorkshire, where he was Head Boy, and won an Exhibition to St Catharine's College, Cambridge where he studied Economics, gaining an MA in 1960.  From 1960 to 1962 he was a market research officer with the York firm of Rowntree & Co.  During his time at Rowntree's, he did the market research for the new product “After Eight” Thin Mints.  He then went into economic journalism, becoming a feature writer for the Financial Times and The Economist.  Leaving journalism, he started, with a partner, a new company, CRU International Ltd, an international business consultancy specialising in minerals and metals. He was also the first Chair of Circle Thirty Three Housing Association, now part of Clarion Housing.

Parliamentary career

Labour
Horam contested Folkestone and Hythe for Labour in the 1966 election, but lost to the incumbent, Albert Costain.  He was elected as the Labour MP for Gateshead West at the 1970 general election.  He was a Chair of The Manifesto Group of right wing Labour MPs and when James Callaghan become Prime Minister entered Government, in September 1976, as a Parliamentary Under Secretary of State to Bill Rodgers in the Department of Transport.  After Labour’s election defeat of 1979 he was a Labour Opposition spokesman on Economic Affairs.

SDP
Horam was one of the first to leave the Labour Party for the SDP in 1981, having become uneasy with the leftward direction of Labour.  From 1981 to 1983 he was SDP spokesman for Economic Affairs under Roy Jenkins. In 1983, his constituency of Gateshead West having been abolished, he fought Newcastle Central, unsuccessfully, as an SDP candidate.

Conservative
Horam joined the Conservative Party shortly before the 1987 election and in 1991 was selected as the Conservative candidate for Orpington, famous for the Liberal by-election victory when Harold Macmillan was Prime Minister. He won the 1992 election with a majority of 12,935 over the Liberal Democrats. When Tony Blair triumphed in 1997 Horam held the seat with a reduced majority. In 2001 when William Hague was the Conservative leader he held on by only 269 votes. In 2005 however he increased his majority to 4,947 over the longstanding Liberal Democrat candidate Chris Maines. The seat has remained Conservative ever since. Despite his constituency being only a short train journey from the House of Commons, Horam claimed expenses for the second home that he maintained there.

Ministerial positions 
In March 1994 Horam was appointed Parliamentary Under Secretary of State, Office of Public Service and Science in the Cabinet Office. In November 1995 he moved sideways to become Parliamentary Under Secretary of State at the Department of Health. Here he had 31 different areas of responsibility but had two particularly large policy areas: reorganising Community Health Councils and establishing the Private Finance Initiative in health. He occupied this position until the Conservative defeat in the 1997 election.

Select Committee activity in the Commons 
Following election as a Conservative MP in 1992, Horam was appointed a member of the Public Accounts Committee. This lasted until he was appointed a Minister in 1995. Following the Labour victory in 1997, he was elected the first Chair of the new Environmental Audit Committee, set up by the Labour government. The main focus of the Committee was the emerging problem of climate change. He held this position until July 2003. When he stood down a Commons motion praised him for his work. During this time, as Chair of a Committee, Horam was a member of the Commons Liaison Committee, which, among other duties, took evidence from the Prime Minister three times a year.

Following re-election in 2005, Horam was appointed a member of the Select Committee on Foreign Affairs, a position he held until 2010.

Political activity in the Commons 
Horam gained some notoriety during the 1997 election when he became the first member of the Major government to come out publicly against joining a single currency.

In 2003 he was one of a handful of Conservative MPs who voted against Britain’s participation in the Iraq war.

From 2003 to 2008 he was an elected member of the Executive of the Conservative Backbench 1992 Committee.

Always interested in the nuts and bolts of democracy, he drafted the original "Equal Votes" legislation which stipulated that Parliamentary constituencies should be of roughly equal size.

On 12 October 2009, Horam announced his intention to stand down at next general election.

Electoral Commission 
On retiring from the House of Commons, Horam was appointed a Commissioner at the Electoral Commission, which supervises all elections and referendums in the UK. He held this post from 2011 to 2018.

House of Lords 
On 4 September 2013 Horam was created a working life peer as Baron Horam of Grimsargh in the County of Lancashire.

Lords Committee Activity 
On  becoming a working peer, he was appointed to the Delegated Powers and Regulatory Reform Committee (2013-2014).  He then moved to the Communications and Digital Committee (2014-2015). After this he became a member of the External Affairs Subcommittee of the European Union Committee (2015–19).

In March 2020 he joined the High Speed (West Midlands-Crewe) Bill Select Committee until its report in 2021.

Political activity in the Lords 
In the Lords he has advocated a Living Wage, raising the Income Tax threshold, better vocational training and more apprenticeships, more help for the Trouble Families Programme, and a big housing drive. A member of the Conservative European Mainstream Group, he remains strongly pro-EU, believing that the UK maximises its influence and prosperity in the EU. After Brexit, he accepted the decision, but argued that Britain should remain a member of the Single European Market, like Norway.

Economic Policy 
In a speech in the Lords on 3 December 2020 on the Government’s spending Review, Horam said that he is a supporter of Modern Monetary Theory believing that "the economic Policy should balance the economy, rather than the Budget". Stating that,"rather than worrying too much about deficits,the advantage of MMT is that it enables Governments to concentrate on what should be done to improve the economy and society,and not be perpetually bogged down in arguments about how to pay for it." He positioned himself, on the raising of taxes, "that they should only be raised to damp down demand should inflation rise."

In support of the 2021 Budget he told the Lords that he, "[takes] the view the first fiscal rule of economics is, in all circumstances, to maximise real economic growth. The second rule is to make the distribution of the rewards of growth as fair as practically possible. I support the Budget because it made some real progress in both these areas. My only doubt about the Budget is the proposed rise in Corporation Tax, which is also a reservation on the part of the Office of Budget Responsibility."

In a speech on the second budget in 2021 in the Lords on 3 November 2021 he said: "The fact is that Britain has, for too long, been trying to get European levels of public service and welfare at US levels of taxation. The crunch has now come. The Government have given clear indication that they prioritise maintaining, and if possible improving, public services and are therefore prepared to put up taxation to the same extent.  That is fundamentally right...There is therefore no evidence that a higher tax rate, within the sort of limits that we are talking about, necessarily adversely affects the rate of growth…A factor that is important is the way in which you use the money that you have raised." Lord Horam went on to criticise the decision to scrap the £20 uplift in Universal Credit, but said that apart from that blemish the Government’s economic strategy was right.

Levelling Up 
In his response to the Queen’s Speech of 2020 in January 2020, Lord Horam called for the Government to deliver on its promises made in the election to help the “towns and cities of the north of England and the midlands”. He welcomed the £3.5 billion being put behind the so-called Towns Fund. He also called for greater investment in technical education,  better connections between London, the north and midlands and criticised the apprenticeship levy.

Also in that Queen’s speech, he was critical of the roll-out of Universal credit, which he said needs "urgent attention" and acknowledged that while something needed to be done about social care, what was really needed was "a big cheque". The government could not deal with this investment by "a more relaxed approach to debt" and called for an increase in taxation specifically in relation to capital gains and dividends. He said that the UK was a "lightly taxed" country compared to others in Europe.

In a speech on 14 October 2021 in the Lords in a debate on Inequalities of Region and Place Horam praised the government’s efforts in helping the north.  He said: "We have a levelling-up fund, a community renewal fund, a shared prosperity fund, and free ports and towns funds. We have the beginning of effective localism in the shape of city mayors. I also think that levelling up will help the south. As the Prime Minister said when he was Mayor of London: "Do we really want the south-east of Britain, already the most densely populated major country in Europe, to resemble a giant suburbia?"

Environment, population growth and immigration 
In a speech in the Lords on 10 December 2020 on the Statutory Instruments introducing new immigration rules, Horam said that ‘this Statutory instrument has been brought about by the UK’s exiting of the EU and therefore leaving the free movement of people system which prevails in the EU." He stated that the Blair Labour Government had bought in heavily to free movement and mass immigration and the results were devastating for some working class communities.  He specifically cited the experience of Paul Embery, the Labour and trade union activist, whose book, Despised, sets out the effect on Dagenham, where he was born. Horam said he hopes that "present politicians of all parties understand the lessons of the last 20 years and listen more to the views of the British people".

In a letter to The Times on 7 September 2022, Horam wrote: “these were part of the policies the rapid population growth of recent decades is causing significant housing, environmental and social problems for our already heavily populated island,..and most (80 per cent) of the increase is down to immigration. The answer is to restore the limits and restraints on the number of work and other visas granted each year; these were part of government policy under all parties until the Blair government steadily abolished them.”

The Union 
In a letter to The Times on 2 July 2021 Lord Horam suggested that one way of improving Union relations within the UK would be to have “regular meetings between the Prime Minister and the First Ministers, revolving between Cardiff, Belfast, Edinburgh and London.”

Common Sense Group of Conservatives 
In 2021 Lord Horam helped in setting up, with Sir John Hayes, MP for South Holland the Deepings, the Common Sense Group of Conservative Parilamentarians. This is now a substantial group in Parliament with a strong core of new “Red Wall” MPs. It campaigns for a robust approach to immigration, law and order and “wokery” and supports the Levelling Up agenda.

Personal life 
He married Judith Jackson, formerly Motoring Editor of The Sunday Times and The Guardian, in 1987. She has two sons by a previous marriage.

In 2010 he was elected a Fellow Commoner of St Catharine's College, Cambridge.

References

External links 
 
 Guardian Unlimited Politics - Ask Aristotle: John Horam MP
 TheyWorkForYou.com - John Horam MP
 BBC Politics Profile

1939 births
Living people
Labour Party (UK) MPs for English constituencies
Conservative Party (UK) life peers
Conservative Party (UK) MPs for English constituencies
Social Democratic Party (UK) MPs for English constituencies
UK MPs 1970–1974
UK MPs 1974
UK MPs 1974–1979
UK MPs 1979–1983
UK MPs 1992–1997
UK MPs 1997–2001
UK MPs 2001–2005
UK MPs 2005–2010
Alumni of St Catharine's College, Cambridge
Fellows of St Catharine's College, Cambridge
Members of the Fabian Society
People from Orpington
Politicians from Wakefield
Politicians from Preston, Lancashire
People educated at Silcoates School
Life peers created by Elizabeth II